The Rough Guide to Tango is a world music compilation album originally released in 1999. Part of the World Music Network Rough Guides series, the album presents the tango music of Argentina with an eye toward the history of the genre, featuring 78 rpm recordings to tracks of the modern day. Teddy Peiro and Tom Andrews wrote the liner notes, and Phil Stanton—co-founder of the World Music Network—produced and compiled the album. This release was followed by a second edition a decade later.

Critical reception

Alex Henderson of AllMusic called the album "far-reaching", demarcating within the tracks the "two types of tango: before and after Astor Piazzolla" (whose influence on the genre, he claimed, was comparable to that of Charlie Parker's on jazz).

Track listing

References

External links 
 

1999 compilation albums
World Music Network Rough Guide albums